The Herschel Medal is awarded by the Royal Astronomical Society (RAS) for "investigations of outstanding merit in observational astrophysics". It is awarded for a single piece of work so that younger scientists can be candidates for the award. It is named after the RAS's first president, William Herschel. The medal was first awarded in 1974. From 1974 to 2004 the Herschel Medal was only awarded every three years. From 2004 the frequency was shortened to two years and from 2012 it will be awarded annually. The medal has been shared twice, in 1977 and 1986. It has been awarded 23 times to a total of 25 people (23 men, two women), mostly from the UK.

Medalists 
Source: Royal Astronomical Society

See also

 List of astronomy awards

References

Astronomy prizes
Astronomy in the United Kingdom
Awards established in 1974
British science and technology awards
Royal Astronomical Society
1974 establishments in the United Kingdom